Cue sports, including three-cushion billiards, nine-ball (a pool discipline) and snooker, were introduced as World Games sports for men and (in the case of nine-ball) for women also at the World Games 2001 in Akita.

Medal table

Medallists

Three-cushion billiards

Men's singles

Pool (Nine-ball)

Men's singles

Women's singles

Snooker

See also 
 Cue sports at the Asian Games

References 

 
Sports at the World Games
World Games